Theodore Roscoe (February 20, 1906 – May 29, 1992) was an American biographer and writer of adventure, fantasy novels and stories.

Biography
Roscoe was born in Rochester, New York, the son of missionaries. He wrote for newspapers and later pulp magazines. Roscoe's stories appeared in pulp magazines including Argosy, Wings, Flying Stories, Far East Adventure Stories, Fight Stories, Action Stories, Adventure, and Weird Tales.  Roscoe travelled widely, included trips to Haiti and North Africa. During a visit to Casablanca, Roscoe befriended a member of the French Foreign Legion. Roscoe later used this man as a model for his fictional Foreign Legion narrator, Thibaut Corday. Roscoe also wrote non-fiction for The American Weekly.

Roscoe's work was praised by H. L. Mencken in a 1929 profile in the Rochester Democrat Chronicle. Mencken said "Many of the so-called literati could learn a lot from Mr. Roscoe. He gets things down with amazing facility". Roscoe was commissioned by the United States Naval Institute to write the detailed and massive histories United States Submarine Operations in World War II (1949) and United States Destroyer Operations in World War II (1953), as well as a 737-page book detailing United States history with a focus on the role of the US Navy (titled This Is Your Navy (1950) and given to navy recruits at boot camp). He subsequently wrote several other books on naval history including The Trent Affair, November, 1861: U.S. detainment of a British ship nearly brings war with England (1972).

A collection of his stories, The Wonderful Lips of Thibong Linh, was published by Donald M. Grant, Publisher, Inc. in 1981.  Altus Press published a three volume collection of his "Thibaut Corday and the Foreign Legion" stories. The biography Pulpmaster: The Theodore Roscoe Story, by Audrey Parente, published by Starmont House (Mercer Island, WA, 1992) was reprinted by Altus in 2012.

References

1906 births
1992 deaths
20th-century American novelists
American fantasy writers
American male novelists
20th-century American historians
American male non-fiction writers
Novelists from New York (state)
American male short story writers
20th-century American biographers
20th-century American short story writers
20th-century American male writers
Pulp fiction writers
American male biographers